Down is a civil parish in County Down, Northern Ireland. It is situated in the historic barony of Lecale Upper.

Settlements
The civil parish contains the following settlements:
Downpatrick

Townlands
Down civil parish contains the following townlands:

Ardmeen
Audleys Acre
Ballydonety
Ballydonnell
Ballydugan
Ballykeel
Ballykilbeg
Ballymote Lower
Ballymote Middle
Ballymote Upper
Ballyrolly
Ballystrew
Ballyvange
Ballywarren
Bonecastle
Cargagh
Clogher
Corbally
Demesne of Down
Grangicam
Hollymount
Jordans Acre
Killavees
Lisnamaul
Magheralagan
Marshallstown
Quarter Cormick
Russells Quarter
Saul Quarter
Struell
Tobercorran
Tobermoney
Tullymurry
Woodgrange

See also
List of civil parishes of County Down

References